
Year 1515 (MDXV) was a common year starting on Monday (link will display the full calendar) of the Julian calendar.

Events 
 January–June 
 January 25 – Francis I of France is crowned (reigns until 1547).
 May 13 – Mary Tudor, Queen of France, and Charles Brandon, 1st Duke of Suffolk, are officially married at Greenwich (near London).
 June 13 – Battle of Turnadag: The army of Ottoman sultan Selim I defeats the beylik of Dulkadir under Bozkurt of Dulkadir.

 July–December 
 July 2 – Manchester Grammar School is endowed by Hugh Oldham, the first free grammar school in England.
 July 22 – At the First Congress of Vienna, a double wedding takes place to cement agreements. Louis, only son of King Vladislaus II of Hungary, marries Mary of Austria, granddaughter of Maximilian I, Holy Roman Emperor; and Mary's brother, Archduke Ferdinand, marries Vladislaus' daughter, Anna.
 August 25 – Conquistador Diego Velázquez de Cuéllar founds Havana, Cuba.
 September 13–14 – Battle of Marignano: The army of Francis I of France defeats the Swiss, thanks to the timely arrival of a Venetian army. Francis restores French control of Milan.
 November 15 – Thomas Wolsey is invested as a Cardinal.
 December 24 – Thomas Wolsey is named Lord Chancellor of England.

 Date unknown 
 Cardinal Wolsey orders construction to begin on what is to become Henry VIII's future summer residence Hampton Court Palace. 
 Bartolomé de las Casas urges Ferdinand II of Aragon to end Amerindian slavery, and recommends experimental free towns.
 The Portuguese are the first Europeans to land in Timor island, as the first settlers arrive to the north coast of Madeira Island, there establishing Saint George.

 Dürer's Rhinoceros is cut.
 The Ottomans conquer the last beyliks of Anatolia, the Beylik of Dulkadir and the Ramadanid Emirate.
 Henry Cornelius Agrippa returns to Northern Italy.

Births 

 January 1 – Johann Weyer, Dutch physician (d. 1588)
 February 4 – Mikołaj "the Black" Radziwiłł, Polish magnate (d. 1565)
 February 14 – Frederick III, Elector Palatine, ruler from the house of Wittelsbach (d. 1576)
 February 18 – Valerius Cordus, German physician, botanist and author (d. 1544)
 March 10 – Injong of Joseon, 12th king of the Joseon Dynasty of Korea (d. 1545)
 March 12 – Caspar Othmayr, German Protestant priest, theologian and composer (d. 1553)
 March 28 – Teresa of Ávila, Spanish Carmelite nun, poet and saint (d. 1582)
 May 2 – Sibylle of Saxony, Duchess of Saxe-Lauenburg (d. 1592)
 May 12
 Christoph, Duke of Württemberg (1550–1568) (d. 1568)
 Gilbert Kennedy, 3rd Earl of Cassilis, Scottish politician and judge (d. 1558)
 June 15 – Anne Parr, Countess of Pembroke, English countess (d. 1552)
 July 4 – Eleonora d'Este, Ferranese noblewoman (d. 1575)
 July 10 – Francisco de Toledo, Viceroy of Peru (d. 1582)
 July 14 – Philip I, Duke of Pomerania-Wolgast (d. 1560)
 July 21 – Philip Neri, Italian Roman Catholic saint (d. 1595)
 September 8 – Alfonso Salmeron, Spanish biblical scholar and early Jesuit (d. 1585)
 September 22 – Anne of Cleves, Fourth Queen of Henry VIII of England (d. 1557)
 October 4 – Lucas Cranach the Younger, German painter (d. 1586)
 October 7 – Infante Duarte, Duke of Guimarães, son of King Manuel I of Portugal (d. 1540)
 October 8 – Margaret Douglas, daughter of Archibald Douglas (d. 1578)
 October 15 – Leone Strozzi, French Navy admiral (d. 1554)
 October 29
 Vincenzo Borghini, Italian monk (d. 1580)
 Mary of Bourbon, daughter of Charles, Duke of Vendôme (d. 1538)
 November 22 – Mary of Guise, queen of James V of Scotland and regent of Scotland (d. 1560)
 December 15 – Maria of Saxony, Duchess of Pomerania (d. 1583)
 date unknown
 Gilbert Kennedy, 3rd Earl of Cassilis, Scottish peer (d. 1558)
 Sebastian Castellio, rector of the College of Geneva (d. 1563)
 Sehzade Mustafa, First born son of Suleiman the Magnificent by Mahidevran Sultan (d. 1553)
 Cristóbal Acosta, Portuguese doctor and natural historian (d. 1580)
 Injong of Joseon, 12th king of the Joseon Dynasty of Korea (d. 1545)
 Pierre de la Ramée, French humanist scholar (d. 1572)
 Thomas Seckford, Master of Requests for Elizabeth I of England (d. 1587)
 Thomas Watson, English Catholic bishop (d. 1584)
 probable
 Leonard Digges, English mathematician and surveyor (d. c. 1559)
 Jean Maillard, French composer 
 Laurence Nowell, English antiquarian (d. 1571)
 Cipriano de Rore, Flemish composer and teacher (d. 1565)
 Nicholas Throckmorton, English churchman, last abbot of Westminster (d. 1571)
 John Willock, Scottish reformer (d. 1585)

Deaths 

 January 1 – King Louis XII of France (b. 1462)
 February 6 – Aldus Manutius, Venetian printer (b. c. 1449)
 March 16 – Queen Janggyeong, Korean royal consort (b. 1491)
 April 15 – Mikołaj Kamieniecki, Polish nobleman (szlachcic) and first Great Hetman of the Crown (b. 1460)
 June 13 – Alaüddevle Bozkurt, Bey of Anatolian Dulkadir
 September 4 – Barbara of Brandenburg, Bohemian queen (b. 1464)
 September 9 – Joseph Volotsky, caesaropapist ideologist of the Russian Orthodox Church
 October – Bartolomeo d'Alviano, Venetian general (b. 1455)
 November 5 – Mariotto Albertinelli, Italian painter (b. 1474)
 December 2 – Gonzalo Fernández de Córdoba, Spanish general and statesman (b. 1453)
 December 16 – Afonso de Albuquerque, Portuguese naval general (b. 1453)
 December 18 – Alexander Stewart, Duke of Ross, Scottish prince (b. 1514)
 date unknown
 Giovanni Giocondo, Italian friar, architect and classical scholar (b. c. 1433 in Verona)
 Eoghan Mac Cathmhaoil, Irish Bishop of Clogher since 1505
 Meñli I Giray, khan of the Crimean Khanate (b. 1445)
 Pietro Lombardo, Italian Renaissance sculptor and architect (b. 1435 in Carona (Ticino))
 Nezahualpilli, Aztec philosopher (b. 1464)
 Alonso de Ojeda, Spanish conquistador (b. 1466)
 probable – Vincenzo Foppa, Italian Renaissance painter (b. 1430)
 Quilago, queen regnant of the Cochasquí in Ecuador (b. 1490)

References